Antonio Di Salvo (born 5 June 1979) is a German-Italian football manager and former forward. He is the manager of the Germany U21 national team.

Playing career
Di Salvo began his senior career with played with his local club SC Paderborn from 1996 to 2000. He had a brief stints with Bayern Munich from 2000 to 2001, before moving to Hansa Rostock until 2006. He transferred to 1860 Munich shortly after. After scoring eight goals in the 2007–08 season, he suffered a knee injury that kept him out of football for a while. He ended his career with Kapfenberger SV, making seven appearances in 2010.

Managerial career
After his playing career, Di Salvo worked on his coaching badges and worked as assistant with the Bayern Munich U17 from 2011 to 2013. He was named the assistant for the Germany U19s shortly thereafter in 2013. In 2016, he was named the assistant manager for the Germany U21s under Stefan Kuntz, and held the post for five years. He formally passed his coaching license in 2018, receiving a DFB manager license. On 23 September 2021, Di Salvo was named the manager for the Germany U21s, as Kuntz left to manage the Turkey national team.

Personal life
Born in Germany, Di Salvo is of Italian descent with roots in Sicily.

Honours
Bayern Munich
 Bundesliga: 2000–01
 DFB-Ligapokal: 2000

References

External links

1979 births
Living people
Sportspeople from Paderborn
German footballers
Footballers from North Rhine-Westphalia
German people of Italian descent
German people of Sicilian descent
Association football forwards
Bundesliga players
2. Bundesliga players
Austrian Football Bundesliga players
SC Paderborn 07 players
FC Bayern Munich footballers
FC Bayern Munich non-playing staff
FC Bayern Munich II players
FC Hansa Rostock players
TSV 1860 Munich players
Kapfenberger SV players
German football managers
Germany national under-21 football team managers
German expatriate footballers
German expatriate sportspeople in Austria
Expatriate footballers in Austria